Hunterdon Plateau is a plateau in western Hunterdon County, New Jersey. It borders the higher Musconetcong Mountain to the northwest, the Delaware River to the west, Amwell Valley to the south and the lower lying areas of the Newark Basin to the east.  The plateau's edge follows a line from Raven Rock to Flemington. From there it follows a curved path west of the South Branch Raritan River until it meets with the Musconetcongs.  It is generally unmarred as a plateau, excluding some of the small valleys of tributaries along the Delaware, of Lopatcong Creek and Wickecheoke Creek and Cakepoulin/Capoolong Creek Valley.  Other features are Thatcher's Hill and Sand Hill which form southeastward extensions to the plateau due to a valley of Walnut Brook and the curve of the plateau there. 
This also occurs between Lockatong Valley and the Delaware River.  A small ridge called Barren Ridge runs through Alexandria and Union Township rises slightly above the rest of the plateau.  Another feature in Holland Township called Gravel Hill also rises above the rest of the plateau.  There are numerous cliffs along the Delaware where the plateau meets it such as Milford Bluffs where prickly pear cacti grow, a rarity in Hunterdon County.  The plateau includes the boroughs of Milford and Frenchtown, as well as part of the borough of Flemington and parts of Kingwood, Raritan, Franklin, Union, Bethlehem, Alexandria, Delaware, and Holland townships. Because of the soil types and relatively flat terrain on the plateau, there are still many farms across the area.

Towns on the plateau

Frenchtown, a borough on the banks of the Delaware named after Swiss French-speaking Paul Henri Mallet-Prevost, with numerous galleries, restaurants and lodgings
Milford, a borough earlier called Burnt Mills (after a mill burned down in 1769) and Millford, Milford sits along the Delaware with a handful of shops and restaurants
Pittstown, a small village named after William Pitt, with a spa and a few restaurants and the southern end of the Capoolong Creek Trail

Sites of interest

Bridge Street in Frenchtown
Capoolong Creek Trail
D&R Canal Trail
Milford Bluffs
 Oak Summit School, Kingwood
 Old Stone Church, Kingwood
Phillips Farm- pick your own
Schick Reserve
Ship Inn Brewery
Volendam Windmill

References

Regions of New Jersey
Landforms of Hunterdon County, New Jersey
Landforms of New Jersey 
Plateaus of the United States